JSC Aviaenergo was a charter airline with headquarters in Moscow, Russia. It was established on 31 December 1992 and operated charter flights within Europe, the CIS and other countries from its main base at Moscow Vnukovo Airport, as well as from Sheremetyevo International Airport. It was wholly owned by RAO UES, although UES, as part of its restructuring, had placed Avianergo on the market. Operations were suspended in 2011 due to poor financial performance (having approached bankruptcy in 2011)

Fleet 
The Aviaenergo fleet consisted of the following aircraft (as of 6 December 2009):

1 Ilyushin Il-62M
3 Tupolev Tu-154M

References

External links 

 

Defunct airlines of Russia
Companies based in Moscow
Airlines established in 1992
Defunct charter airlines
1992 establishments in Russia
Airlines disestablished in 2011